Rapelje is an unincorporated community and census-Designated Place in northern Stillwater County, Montana, United States. Rapelje was named for J. M. Rapelje, general manager and vice president of the Northern Pacific Railway. Rapelje had a population of approximately 110 people as of the 2000 census. Rapelje is located 24 miles north of Columbus on Montana Secondary Highway 306.

Demographics

History

Rapelje was originally called Lake Basin due to its geographical landscape, but in 1913 it was named after J.M. Rapelje, who was one of the heads of the Northern Pacific Railroad. Rapelje was first established as a town where local railroad workers of the Northern Pacific Railway would live in the late 1800s. As more people began to work at the railroad, the town grew bigger in both size and population. They had multiple establishments such as a hotel, a grocery store, a town hall, a K-12 school, and many other things. A post office was established in 1913, and the four grain towers (which are still there today) were put in business. A railroad destination point, Rapelje developed into a reasonable town with a number of grain elevators, its own school district, an evangelical church, a cafe, and later a violin shop and clothing business. In 1980, the railroad was taken out of Rapelje, and the population declined, as well as sales and business. Businesses and residents of Rapelje largely dispersed from the town over the following decades. The hotel burned down, the town hall was removed, and the grocery store was closed.

24 Hours of Rapelje 
The 24 Hours of Rapelje is a USA Cycling sanctioned endurance mountain bike race held on the weekend in June closest to the summer solstice.  The race is coordinated by the local volunteers.

Climate
According to the Köppen Climate Classification system, Rapelje had a semi-arid climate, abbreviated "BSk" on climate maps.

Education
Rapelje School District educates students from kindergarten through 12th grade. Rapelje High School's team name is the Renegades.

References

Unincorporated communities in Stillwater County, Montana
Unincorporated communities in Montana